Vegetable soup may refer to:

 Vegetable soup, a vegetable-based soup
 "Vegetable Soup" (song), a song released on the 2003 album Whoo Hoo! Wiggly Gremlins! by The Wiggles
 Vegetable Soup (TV series), an American children's television program airing on PBS and NBC from 1975 to 1978

See also
 List of vegetable soups
 Vegetable (disambiguation)
 Soup (disambiguation)